
Overy may refer to:

Places 
 Burnham Overy, a civil parish on the north coast of Norfolk, England
 Burton Overy, a civil parish in the Harborough  district of Leicestershire, England

People 
 Richard Overy (born 1947), British historian of World War II and the Third Reich
 Mike Overy (born 1951), former professional baseball player

Other 
 Allen & Overy, a British law firm

See also 
 Ovary, reproductive organ in many animals